Crash Landing on You is a 2019–2020 South Korean television series written by Park Ji-eun, directed by Lee Jeong-hyo and starring Hyun Bin, Son Ye-jin, Seo Ji-hye, and Kim Jung-hyun. It is about a successful South Korean businesswoman and chaebol heiress who, while paragliding near Seoul, South Korea, is swept up in a sudden storm, crash-lands in the North Korean portion of the Demilitarized Zone (DMZ), and meets an army captain and son of the Director of the GPB in the Korean People's Army who decides he will help her hide. Over time, they fall in love, despite the divide and dispute between their respective countries.

The series aired on tvN in South Korea and on Netflix worldwide from December 14, 2019, to February 16, 2020. It is the highest-rated tvN drama and the fourth highest-rated South Korean TV drama in cable television history.

Synopsis
Yoon Se-ri (Son Ye-jin) is a South Korean successful entrepreneur and a chaebol heiress. One day, while paragliding in Seoul, a tornado blows her off course. As a result, she crash-lands into the North Korean portion of the DMZ. Ri Jeong-hyeok (Hyun Bin) is a member of the North Korean elite and a captain in the Korean People's Army. As he is patrolling, he meets Se-ri and saves her. Having decided to help her go back to the South, he hides her from other North Koreans, especially Cho Cheol-gang (Oh Man-seok) who is out to expose him. As they spend time together, they fall in love.

Plot
Crash Landing on You tells the story of two star-crossed lovers, Yoon Se-ri (Son Ye-jin), a South Korean chaebol heiress to Queen's Group, and Ri Jeong-hyeok (Hyun Bin), a member of the North Korean elite and a captain in Korean People's Army. 

One day, while Yoon Se-ri is paragliding in Seoul, South Korea, a sudden tornado knocks her out and blows her off course. She awakens to find that her paraglider has crashed into a tree in a forest in the North Korean portion of the DMZ, an area forbidden for South Koreans. She then meets Ri Jeong-hyeok, who eventually gives her shelter and develops plans to secretly help her return to South Korea. Over time, they fall in love, despite the divide and dispute between their respective countries.

Back in South Korea, Yoon Se-ri's family suppresses the news of her disappearance out of fear that it will depress the stock price of the chaebol. Just before Se-ri went missing, her retiring father informed his family that he intended to announce her as his successor based on her abilities as a businesswoman, as shown by her successfully building her own company, instead of her half-brothers, Se-jun and Se-hyung, who struggled managing the chaebol's subsidiaries. The brothers are supported by their equally-ambitious wives, Do Hye-ji (Hwang Woo-seul-hye) and Go Sang-ah (Yoon Ji-min), respectively. In Se-ri's absence, Se-hyung outmaneuvers his siblings through unscrupulous means to win the succession battle to lead the family firm, while Sang-ah attempts to take over Se-ri's company.

Se-ri and Jeong-hyeok's story is intertwined with that of Seo Dan (Seo Ji-hye) and Gu Seung-jun (Kim Jung-hyun). Dan is the sophisticated daughter of a wealthy North Korean department store owner. She has been studying the cello in Russia for several years but returns to marry Jeong-hyeok, to whom she is engaged through an arranged marriage even though they have only met a few times. As she returns to Pyongyang, she crosses paths more than once with Gu Seung-jun, who had fled to North Korea (under the protection of corrupt North Korean officers) in order to escape from the pursuit of Se-hyung, under whose incompetent watch he had embezzled large amounts of money.

The first half of the story follows Jeong-hyeok's attempts to hide Se-ri and help her get back to South Korea. They are impeded by Cho Cheol-gang (Oh Man-seok), a corrupt and ruthless officer from the State Security Department, who had previously arranged for the murder of Jeong-hyeok's older brother, an officer who tried to expose him for his traitorous deeds against the North Korean regime. Jeong-hyeok's attachment to Se-ri distresses not only Dan, his fiancée, but also his father, who is a high-ranking political figure, as the discovery of Jeong-hyeok harboring a South Korean citizen could be used by rival officials to ruin their family's reputation.

In the second half of the story, Se-ri is able to return to South Korea and resume leadership of her company, surprising her family and others who had thought she was dead. While Cheol-gang is initially convicted and sentenced to life imprisonment for his crimes, he escapes custody through aide from his loyal soldiers and criminal network whereby he infiltrates South Korea to go after Se-ri. Despite opposition from his father who nevertheless reluctantly gives his support, Jeong-hyeok first arrived in South Korea discreetly before his soldiers was clandestinely sent to Seoul by Jeong-hyeok father to assist Jeong-hyeok in his aim to protect Se-ri from Cheol-gang's vengeance. Meanwhile, in North Korea, despite Seo Dan and Seung-jun's initial encounters being random and unpleasant, she shelters him when the corrupt officers betray him to Se-hyung's gangsters, and they eventually fall in love.

Cast

Main
 Hyun Bin as Ri Jeong-hyeok
 Lee Chun-moo as young Jeong-hyeok
 Kim Seung-chan as teenage Jeong-hyeok
 A proficient but emotionally-reserved Captain of Company Five in the Korean People's Army who is stationed along the North Korean portion of the DMZ. He is well-respected by the unit he leads and the locals of the rural village he resides in. A piano prodigy, he was studying to become a concert pianist in Switzerland before being forced to join the North Korean military after his older brother died in a mysterious car accident. While he comes from a powerful political family, his father being the Director of the General Political Bureau, he prefers to keep his lineage a secret in order to secretly investigate his older brother's death. He hides and protects Se-ri after she accidentally crash-lands into his patrol territory. As he tries to help Se-ri find her way back into South Korea, he begins to fall in love with her and realizes that he has met her before when he was travelling in Switzerland with Seo Dan.
 Son Ye-jin as Yoon Se-ri
 Kim Tae-yeon as young Se-ri
 A successful South Korean CEO and chaebol heiress to Queen's Group. She has a troubled family history as she is her father's illegitimate child whose biological mother died after she was born, resulting in a strained relationship with her stepmother due to a childhood misunderstanding. She is also involved in an upcoming family succession battle, the latter making her the target of resentment from her half-brothers and their wives. After she rejected her brother's attempt to force her into an arranged marriage that would send her to the United Kingdom, she had numerous casual relationships with celebrities, but never developed any close companionships. She is nonetheless an independent wealthy businesswoman who runs her own successful fashion and beauty company, Seri's Choice. She is known for being a demanding boss, staging publicity stunts and is a picky eater who practices intermittent fasting. She meets Ri Jeong-hyeok after accidentally crash-landing in North Korea due to a paragliding accident, and falls in love with him as he shelters her in the North Korean military housing, where she becomes close to the ajummas and four of his soldiers.
 Seo Ji-hye as Seo Dan
 Park Seo-yeon as young Dan
 A North Korean department store heiress and aspiring cellist who is also Ri Jeong-hyeok's fiancée through an affianced marriage arranged by their parents. While she has been infatuated with Jeong-hyeok since they were middle-school classmates, he doesn't reciprocate her feelings but agrees to the betrothed marriage out of a sense of duty towards his parents. Before the wedding, Dan desperately tries to prevent the marriage from becoming a sham after realising that Jeong-hyeok had never loved her from the start. She eventually falls for Seung-jun.
 Kim Jung-hyun as Gu Seung-jun / Alberto Gu
 An intelligent, charming, but poor South Korean conman with British citizenship. After his father was scammed by Se-ri's father, leading to his family's bankruptcy, he ingratiated himself with Se-ri's brother, Se-hyung, in order to embezzle from the Yoon family's company. Se-hyung attempted to marry off Se-ri to Seung-jun in order to be rid of her, but Se-ri sensed his ill intentions on their first meeting and rejected him. Seung-jun nonetheless successfully cheated a fortune from the firm under Se-hyung's watch, and fled to North Korea to avoid arrest, while under pursuit by gangsters hired by Se-hyung. He eventually falls for Dan after running into her on many occasions.

Recurring

North Korean soldiers in Company Five
 Yang Kyung-won as Pyo Chi-su, an acerbic Sergeant Major in Company Five, who enjoys drinking "medicine" on and off the job and antagonizing Se-ri because of his paranoia against South Koreans. Despite his grumpy attitude towards Se-ri, he eventually grows to care about her.
 Yoo Su-bin as Kim Ju-meok, a jovial Corporal in Company Five, who uses his fascination with Korean dramas to explain South Korean culture to his team. He is frequently called out for watching K-dramas instead of working.
 Tang Jun-sang as Geum Eun-dong, an innocent Lance-Corporal in Company Five, who is the sole provider of his family and the youngest member of the unit. He has over 9 years of military service left to complete and misses his mother dearly.
 Lee Shin-young as Park Kwang-beom, a quiet Staff Sergeant in Company Five, oblivious of his model-worthy good looks.

People around Se-ri
  as Yoon Jeung-pyeong, Se-ri's father, South Korean Chaebol and Chairman of Queen's Group. After serving time for financial malfeasance, he looks to name one of his children heir to his chairmanship.
 Bang Eun-jin as Han Jeong-yeon, Se-ri's stepmother. She struggles to reconcile her resentment towards Se-ri as a product of her husband's infidelity, with Se-ri's sincere love and affection towards her.
  as Yoon Sae-jun, Se-ri's immature and hot-headed eldest half-brother, who sides with Se-ri against Sae-hyung.
 Hwang Woo-seul-hye as Do Hye-ji, Se-jun's materialistic but supportive wife.
 Park Hyung-soo as Yoon Sae-hyung, Se-ri's unflappable second older half-brother, whose greed and naiveté allowed Seung-jun to embezzle funds from Queen's Group.
 Yoon Ji-min as Go Sang-ah, Sae-hyung's intelligent and ruthlessly-ambitious wife who covets Se-ri's company.
 Go Kyu-pil as Hong Chang-sik, Se-ri's over-stressed team manager who, along with Su-chan, tries to find Se-ri's whereabouts after her disappearance.
 Im Chul-soo as Park Su-chan, Se-ri's insurance agent, who becomes obsessed with proving that Se-ri survived the paragliding accident.

People around Jeong-hyeok
  as Ri Chung-ryeol, Jeong-hyeok's father, Director of the General Political Bureau and vice-marshal of Korean People's Army.
 Jung Ae-ri as Kim Yun-hui, Jeong-hyeok's mother, and a former actress. Like her husband, she still grieves Mu-hyeok's death.
 Ha Seok-jin as Ri Mu-hyeok, Jeong Hyeok's deceased older brother and an Army Captain, who was killed in a staged accident for threatening to expose Cho Cheol-gang.

People around Dan
 Jang Hye-jin as Ko Myeong-eun, Dan's ambitious mother who is also a successful North Korean department store owner. She is eager to see her daughter get married to Ri Jeong-Hyeok and enjoys a playful, occasionally violent relationship with her brother, Ko Myeong-seok. She has a tendency of inserting English words into her speech to appear more sophisticated.
 Park Myung-hoon as Ko Myeong-seok, Dan's cheerful maternal uncle who is also a powerful Major-General in the State Security Department.

People in North Korean Village
 Kim Sun-young as Na Wol-suk, the no-nonsense Chief of the People's unit (head of the village) who occasionally gets into arguments with Yoon Se-ri but eventually warms up to her. She has a tendency to drink and say embarrassing things.
 Kim Jung-nan as Ma Young-ae, the Senior Colonel Kim's wife who strongly influences her husband. The other women in the village fawn over her, and she is easily susceptible to Yoon Se-ri's flattery. She is frustrated by her son's subpar performance in school despite hiring a university student tutor for him.
 Jang So-yeon as Hyun Myeong-sun, Jung Man-bok's supportive, shy, kind wife. She is the first to show support and bring food for Ma Young-ae when the Senior Colonel is arrested.
 Cha Chung-hwa as Yang Ok-geum, a hairdresser who wears bright makeup. She is closest with Na Wol-suk.
  as Jung Woo-pil, Man-bok and Myeong-sun's son
 Gu Jun-woo as Kim Nam-sik, Senior Colonel Kim and Young-ae's son who gets bad grades
 Lim Sung-mi as Geum-soon, a market vendor in the marketplace who secretly sells South Korean goods

People in North Korean Forces
 Oh Man-seok as Cho Cheol-gang, a Lieutenant Commander in the North Korean Armed Forces' Security Bureau, who is the principal villain of the story. An orphan, he is corrupt and heads a vast criminal operation that stretches across the Korean peninsula, including harboring fugitives such as Gu Seung-jun while having no qualms turning them over to the highest bidder.
 Kim Young-min as Jung Man-bok, a North Korean wiretapper coerced by Cheol-gang to facilitate criminal activities, which has made him feel guilty about his work. He is known as "The Rat" among members of the village due to his job, resulting in his family being ostracized. Forced to facilitate Ri Mu-hyeok's death despite being the recipient of his kindness, Man-bok hopes to atone for his betrayal by assisting Jeong-hyeok.
  as Kim Ryong-hae, a Senior Colonel who is Jeong-hyeok's superior and Young-ae's husband. He is known to be controlled by his wife. He dislikes Jeong-hyeok but, after learning of his real identity as the son of the Director of the General Political Bureau, he tries his best to please him.
  as Cheon Su-bok, a corrupt North Korean government official who helps people illegally enter and stay in North Korea.

Others
  as Manager Oh, an intermediate broker who connects Seung-jun to the North Korean "keeping business".
  as Chief Kim, Chief of the National Intelligence Service and investigator. He understands the relationship between Ri Jeong-hyeok and Yoon Se-ri and helps to make their parting more bearable.
 Christian Lagahit as North Korean Villager

Special appearances
 Jung Kyung-ho as Cha Sang-woo, Se-ri's South Korean ex-boyfriend (Ep. 1, 5 & 7)
 Park Sung-woong as a North Korean taxi driver (Ep. 4)
  as a house villager
 Yoon Seol-mi as a train salesperson
 Na Young-hee as a North Korean wedding dress boutique owner (Ep. 7)
 Kim Soo-hyun as Won Ryu-hwan / Bang Dong-gu, a North Korean spy from Division 11, disguised as a village idiot (Ep. 10)
 Kim Sook as a North Korean fortune teller (Ep. 11 & 16)
 Choi Ji-woo as herself (Ep. 13), an actress whom Kim Ju-meok idolized from his secret viewing of Korean dramas.

Episodes

Production
The series reunited Son Ye-jin and Hyun Bin after first collaborated together in the 2018 film The Negotiation.

Development
The premise of Crash Landing on You was inspired by a real event involving South Korean actress Jung Yang. In September 2008, Yang and three others had to be rescued after bad fog had caused their leisure boat to drift "into the maritime boundary between North and South Korea." Park Ji-eun, the drama's screenwriter, was introduced to North Korean defector turned film adviser and writer Kwak Moon-wan, who became part of the drama's writing team. Kwak, who studied film directing in Pyongyang and had also been a member of an elite security force protecting the Kims, helped in crafting the drama's plot and in conceptualizing the setting and scenes in the drama portraying North Korean life.

Netflix's investment also helped the show to garner the budget of US$20 million.

Filming
The production process proved to be "painstakingly meticulous", owing both to South Korea's relationship with North Korea (where most of the story's plot ensues), as well as to avoid any unintentional violations of the 1948 National Security Act which forbids public praise or propaganda of North Korea and the Kim Family. The script avoided use of the honorific Chairman to refer to North Korea's leaders, and visible propaganda signs avoid mentioning anything about Kim Il-Sung, Kim Jong-Il, or Kim Jong-Un (while their mandatory portraits were usually either blurred or obscured by the camera angles). In addition, the North Korean lapel pins used by North Korean characters were one third smaller than their actual size. Props manager Joo Dong-man said the crew did not have a "guidebook on multiple hurdles he had to hop over – skillfully and delicately – to accurately depict the country while dodging criticism" and, thus, had to be careful "not to misrepresent the state". Their research was also guided by North Koreans living in South Korea.

The first script reading took place on July 31, 2019, in Sangam-dong, Seoul, and filming overseas started at the end of August 2019. North Korean scenes were shot in South Korea and Mongolia. Scenes that took place in Switzerland were shot on location. The village of Iseltwald, one such location, experienced a tourism boom as a result.

Original soundtrack

The following is the official track list of Crash Landing on You (Original Television Soundtrack) album. The tracks with no indicated lyricists and composers are the drama's musical score; the artists indicated for these tracks are the tracks' composers themselves. Singles included on the album were released from December 15, 2019, to February 16, 2020.

Chart performance

Reception

Commercial performance 
With 1.75 billion online views, Crash Landing on You outperformed the prior leader, Mr. Sunshine, for most viewed drama clips by 200 million views as of February 17, 2020. The success of the drama helped to boost brand items due to product placement. The lead characters portrayed by Hyun Bin and Son Ye-jin ate Gold Olive Chicken, a product which had a 100% sales improvement due to the show. There was also an increase in sales of the Swarovski earrings worn by Son Ye-jin.

International response
It was a huge success in China. The hashtag for the drama's final episode has received over 460 million views on Weibo. The drama's main streaming website, which holds the copyright in China, crashed on the night it aired the final episode due to the enormous number of users. 

It was also extremely popular in Japan during the period of the COVID-19 pandemic via Netflix. While the Korean Wave is a historically prominent component of media within Japan, Crash Landing on You has been uniquely influential there, in part due to its portrayal of daily life in North Korea. The series was featured on Japanese-Netflix's top 10 for an astonishing 69 consecutive weeks.

The series was also a hit in the Philippines, where many viewers noted similarities between the plot line and the political narrative of the country during the COVID-19 pandemic.

In the United States, Variety named Crash Landing on You one of "The Best International Shows on Netflix", and one of the "Best International TV Series of 2020." Time also ranked it as one of the best Korean dramas on Netflix. Elle ranked it number 1 (out of 10) on the October 2020 10 Best K-Dramas To Binge-Watch On Netflix list, and Vogue listed it as one of "Netflix: 4 Korean dramas to discover this summer." Boy Genius Report ranked it #2 of the five "K-dramas you absolutely must watch on Netflix." BuzzFeed listed it as number 3 of the top 27 best K-dramas on Netflix. Forbes noted that it ranked number 1 out of the top 10 on a Netflix's Instagram list of its most romantic series, and Screen Rant ranked it as having the #2 (out of the top 10) "tear-jerking scenes in K-dramas." In addition, Jo Walker of The Guardian'''s "Stream Team" called it "addictively off-the-wall, heartbreaking and hilarious." Adella Suliman and Stella Kim of NBC News also suggested that the drama "features all the ingredients a viewer could wish for" and has "drawn a global audience of millions, many no doubt searching for entertainment as they while away their time in coronavirus-related lockdowns." Wadzanai Mhute of The Daily Beast argues that Crash Landing on You, "was a cultural phenomenon in its native South Korea, and it's gone criminally overlooked in the States, where it's available to stream on Netflix." Megan O'Keefe of Decider states that, "Crash Landing on You is a show unlike anything you've ever seen. It has insane action sequences, glorious montages of wealth porn, unblinking looks at the impoverished lives of everyday North Koreans, and one of the most heart-wrenching love stories in ages. With 16 90-minute-long episodes, it's truly a feast to be savored and the perfect antidote to the winter quarantine blues."

Al Jazeera stated that it is a hallyu success.

Representation of and reception in South and North Korea
General
Although the series is a work of fiction, it has received some positive reviews from North Korean defectors for its depiction of everyday life in North Korea. At the same time, some details, such as the availability of food, relatively warm behavior of the army and the ease with which the characters cross the border have been criticized. Kim Ara, one of the extras who portrayed a North Korean villager, is a writer and actress from North Korea who states that she felt "like [she] was actually back in a North Korean village." Kwak Moon-wan, a North Korean defector, who had served with the Supreme Guard Command (which protects the ruling Kim family) worked as an adviser for the series, providing the writers with details about life in North Korea as well as North Korean governmental agencies that added credibility to the show. He acknowledged some of the criticism, admitting that he has taken liberties with the depiction of North Korea (such as not mentioning food shortages), but rejected the claim that he was glamorizing the regime or drawing a false equivalence, saying that the show also depicted some of the darker aspect of life under the regime, such as the issue of kotjebi (child homelessness) and the frequent power cuts. Some North Korean refugees, such as Chun Hyo-jin, who defected from the border village of Hyesan at the age of nineteen, tend to agree: "Even if what they say, that it glamorizes North Korea, is true, would they choose to live there? I don't think so". Even though the drama leaves political matters aside, which are essential to the North Korea issue as she sees it, she says it still is of great significance: "Its depiction of North Korea is a bit far from reality, but it has made the people interested in North Korea". The drama's producer Lee Jung-hyo said during a press conference in Seoul in December: "I know some people are uncomfortable about our subject, North Korea, but we don't portray a wholly authentic North Korea in our drama. Most settings are closer to a fantasy, although some aspects do reflect real North Korean life".

Kang Na-ra, a North Korean defector who advised the show's production team, stated that about 60% of North Korea's depiction in the show is accurate: "The richer families in North Korea like to show off their wealth by adding lace curtains to their windows. So that was pretty well portrayed". She also appreciated the detail about kimchi caves: "Since rural North Korea doesn't get electricity, they don't have refrigerators. They have kimchi caves where they store kimchi, and that was also recreated well". House checks are also a regular affair. She revealed that she once had to hide inside a furnace at the house of the broker who helped her to escape to avoid detection. In the drama, the heiress had to hide in the kimchi storage area when security forces came knocking one night. As depicted in the drama, North Koreans are allowed to choose only from a fixed list of hair styles - 18 for women and 28 for men. "There's a punishment for you if you don't comply" Kang said in an interview with YouTube channel DKDKTV. On the other hand, as she explained in a YouTube video, the characters were able to slip across the border much more easily than in real life: "I had to pay a broker 10 million won (US$8,400) to swim across the Yalu river [which borders North Korea and China] while being shot at from behind by soldiers [when I escaped]". Cartoonist Choi Seong-guk, who defected to the South in 2011, also said the drama set is 60% accurate. The portrayal of jangmadang, or local markets where all kinds of goods, including imports from South Korea, are sold is especially real, he told The Sunday Times. However, he felt that the drama "glamorized the soldiers too much, almost to an uncomfortable extent". He said North Korean men enter the military when they are 17 and serve for 10 to 13 years. "During this time, they are...ruthless and harsh, robbing homes and raping women at night". Still, he hopes the drama will make its way to North Korea and go viral: "I hope the North Koreans who see this drama will realize how positively the South Koreans think of them and learn to change".

There were also critical responses to the themes of the drama in both regions. In January 2020, The Christian Liberal Party (CLP) filed a complaint in South Korea against tvN at the Seoul Metropolitan Police Agency, accusing the network of glamorizing North Korea through this series, in violation of the National Security Law. Then, in March 2020, a few North Korean media outlets criticized unnamed South Korean programs and films that explored relations between North and South Korea. While Crash Landing on You was not directly mentioned by the media outlets, it was perceived to be among the referenced works. Another is the 2019 film, Ashfall, although that film was also not directly cited in the articles.

Scholarship
Stephen Epstein (Victoria University of Wellington) and Christopher Green (Leiden University) suggest that while Crash Landing on You is formulaic, it also "is a crucial text for evaluating ongoing change in South Korean popular representations of its neighbour. Indeed, given the concerted use of North Korean backdrops in Crash Landing on You and the size and global extent of its audiences, the show is likely the most noteworthy South Korean popular culture representation of North Korea yet produced."
Yun Suk-jin, a professor at Chungnam National University concurs, noting that the series "changed the stereotypes on North Korea and candidly showed that it too is a place where people live." Sarah A. Son, Lecturer in Korean Studies at the University of Sheffield also agrees, noting that Crash Landing on You responds to the "socio-cultural divide" between the North and the South, which academic scholarship cites as one of the biggest obstacles to future unification. Son argues that "through the re-framing of stereotypes, albeit with some creative licence, Crash Landing on You arguably humanises the North for its audience in ways that inter-Korean dialogue has not in recent years. Despite its soft-focus romanticisation of the political situation, Crash Landing on You brings the pain of the division to a personal level for a generation of Koreans who, unlike their grandparents, have no memory of what it was like to be a single nation."

Joanna Elfving-Hwang, Associate Professor of Korean Studies at the University of Western Australia notes that "North Korea tends to appear in our imagination as the 'axis of evil', we think of [negative things like] nuclear weapons and human rights abuses...this drama has dared to think about North Korean people differently and represented them as quite human and quite Korean." Steve Hung Lok-wai, a Korean Affairs expert from the Chinese University of Hong Kong states that the drama sidestepped larger political issues through a narrative that did not end with the male lead's defection: "Lots of people questioned whether the male lead, the North Korean soldier, would end up defecting to the South for love, but they were able to sidestep that scenario and gave it a plausible ending where the two would meet in Switzerland". Thus, he argues, it's "quite smart because they avoided all the real taboos but made it believable enough where it would make people think about these political problems." John Delury, a professor at Yonsei University, praised the series for its decision to draw parallels between powerful families in both the South and the North, and to humanize North Koreans beyond generic stereotypes.

 Ratings 
The series was a huge rating success in South-Korea. This series aired on tvN, a cable channel/pay TV which normally has a relatively smaller audience compared to free-to-air TV/public broadcasters (KBS, SBS, MBC and EBS). Crash Landing on You is the  fourth highest-rated South Korean TV drama in cable television history. Early in its run, Crash Landing on You was the fourth highest rated Korean cable drama. The final episode's ratings made it the second highest rated Korean drama in cable television history at that time, surpassing fellow tvN dramas Reply 1988 and Guardian: The Lonely and Great God, until It finally became the fourth highest rated drama, surpassed by both JTBC drama, The World of the Married and Reborn Rich . 

 Accolades 
In May 2020 the show's scriptwriter, Park Ji-eun, was named "Person of the Year" by South Korea's Unification Ministry, for contributing to "unification education."

Musical adaptation
On March 29, 2021, it was announced that Crash Landing on You'' would be adapted into a musical and the production companies Pop Music and T2N Media had completed a global copyright contract with Studio Dragon. The musical  was performed at the Shinhan Card Artium, COEX, Gangnam-gu, Seoul from September 16 to November 13, 2022.

Notes

References

External links

  
 Crash Landing on You on Netflix
 
 

TVN (South Korean TV channel) television dramas
Korean-language television shows
Korean-language Netflix exclusive international distribution programming
Serial drama television series
2019 South Korean television series debuts
2020 South Korean television series endings
North Korea in fiction
South Korean romantic comedy television series
South Korean military television series
Television episodes set in North Korea
Television series by Studio Dragon
Television series by Culture Depot
Television shows filmed in South Korea
Television shows filmed in Switzerland
Television shows set in North Korea
Works about North Korea–South Korea relations
Television shows written by Park Ji-eun